Hokowhitu is a riverside suburb of the New Zealand city of Palmerston North, with some of the highest property values in the city.

The Palmerston North Teachers' College was built in Hokowhitu in the 1960s. Massey University took over the college in 2009. The New Zealand Defence Force began using some of the buildings in 2011.

Massey relocated the college to Turitea campus in 2013 and sold the land in 2016. When the site was sold the land consisted of 20 buildings, including halls, offices, a library, a marae and sporting facilities. The site began to be redeveloped into housing in 2018.

The Hokowhitu Lagoon, Caccia Birch House, Jickell Street Reserve and Manawatu Golf Course are located next to the former education campus. Wallace Park, the home of the Ruahine Association Football Club and local cricket teams, is located nearby. Other local features include the Hokowhitu Domain, Crewe Crescent Reserve, Franklin Reserve, Fitzroy Bend Park, Milverton Park and playground, Awatea Reserve and stream, Hardie St Park and Centennial Drive Reserve.

Hokowhitu is part of the Palmerston North and Te Tai Hauāuru electorates.

Until 2013, it had its own ward councilors on the Palmerston North City Council.

Demographics

It had a population of 10,950 at the 2018 New Zealand census, an increase of 315 people (3.0%) since the 2013 census, and an increase of 399 people (3.8%) since the 2006 census. There were 4,113 households. There were 5,232 males and 5,712 females, giving a sex ratio of 0.92 males per female, with 1,830 people (16.7%) aged under 15 years, 2,838 (25.9%) aged 15 to 29, 4,557 (41.6%) aged 30 to 64, and 1,725 (15.8%) aged 65 or older.

Ethnicities were 77.5% European/Pākehā, 11.8% Māori, 3.0% Pacific peoples, 15.3% Asian, and 3.3% other ethnicities (totals add to more than 100% since people could identify with multiple ethnicities).

The proportion of people born overseas was 26.7%, compared with 27.1% nationally.

Although some people objected to giving their religion, 47.8% had no religion, 38.5% were Christian, 1.9% were Hindu, 1.4% were Muslim, 1.7% were Buddhist and 2.5% had other religions.

Of those at least 15 years old, 3,138 (34.4%) people had a bachelor or higher degree, and 942 (10.3%) people had no formal qualifications. Of those 15 or older, 4,197 (46.0%) people were employed full-time, 1,521 (16.7%) were employed part-time, and 399 (4.4%) were unemployed.

Education

Manukura School is a co-educational designated character school for Year 9 to 13 students. It was originally based on the old Massey University campus.

References

Suburbs of Palmerston North
Populated places on the Manawatū River